Jean-Jacques Milteau (born 17 April 1950, Paris) is a French blues harmonica player, singer, and songwriter, as well as radio presenter.

Career
Milteau became interested in the harmonica when he first heard folk and rock music (such as Bob Dylan and The Rolling Stones) in the 1960s. He played with French singers such as Yves Montand, Eddy Mitchell, Jean-Jacques Goldman, Maxime Le Forestier, Barbara, and Charles Aznavour in various styles, from blues to jazz. He has been a member of the French bands Les Enfoirés and New Bluegrass Connection.

In 1989, he recorded his first solo album, Blues Harp, and toured the world with Manu Galvin at the guitar and with guest musicians including Mighty Mo Rodgers and Demi Evans.
He has authored methods for learning the harmonica and, since 2001, is leading a radio show dedicated to blues on the French station TSF Jazz.

In 2017, JJ collaborated on a new album by Eric Bibb entitled 'Migration Blues'.

Awards
 2001: Best Blues Album Memphis (French Victoire de la musique)

Selected discography
 1983: Just Kiddin''' with Mauro Serri
 1989: Blues Harp 1991: Explorer 1992: Le grand blues band et J.J. Milteau 1993: Live 1995: Routes 1996: Merci d'être venus 1998: Blues live 1999: Bastille blues 2000: Honky Tonk blues (live)
 2001: Memphis with Little Milton and Mighty Sam McClain
 2003: Blue 3rd with Gil Scott-Heron, Terry Callier, N’Dambi, Howard Johnson
 2006: Fragile 2007: Live, hot n'blues (Universal) with Demi Evans and Andrew Jones
 2008: Soul Conversation with Michael Robinson and Ron Smyth
 2009: Harmonicas 2011: Consideration with Michael Robinson and Ron Smyth
 2012: Blowin' in the past 2015 Lead Belly's Gold with Eric Bibb
 2018 CrossBorder Blues with Harrison Kennedy and Vincent Ségal
 2021 Lost Highway''

References

External links

 Milteau's official website

 See on  "La Restauration Audio" The "Soul Conversation" album with musicals samples and an exclusive interview (2002) : JJ Milteau tell the harmonica's story to Jean Pierre Bameulle
 Discover the interview of Jean-Jacques Milteau on E.K. TV  (with English subtitles) as well as his participation to the jam session during the 25th anniversary of Dixiefrog

1950 births
Living people
Musicians from Paris
Blues harmonica players
French singer-songwriters
EmArcy Records artists
Naïve Records artists
Universal Music France artists
Columbia Records artists
French radio presenters